José Solís y Folch de Cardona, grande de España and knight of the Order of Santiago (February 4, 1716 in Madrid – April 27, 1770) was a Spanish colonial administrator and viceroy of New Granada from November 24, 1753 to February 25, 1761.

Background
Solís y Folch de Cardona was a son of José Solís y Gante, 3rd Duke of Montellano, one of the original members of the Real Academia Española. His brother Francisco de Solís y Folch de Cardona (1713-1775) was a Roman Catholic cardinal. José was a cavalry colonel from 1736 to 1747, in charge of a regiment. Spanish King Ferdinand VI named him viceroy of New Granada.

As viceroy
He inaugurated an era of ostentatious ceremony previously unknown in this Spanish colony. He fortified the mint, built roads, bridges and aqueducts (including that of Santa Fé de Bogotá) and established missions. He ordered the first census of the colony. He took steps to secure the submission of the Motilon, Chimila and Cunacuna indigenous people of Darién. He also reorganized the postal service and improved tax collection and the performance of the Audiencia. He tried to organize the mineral industry and internal commerce. He reestablished the chair of medicine at the Colegio del Rosario. In addition he formed a commission to establish the boundaries with the Portuguese colony of Brazil.

He founded the Hospital San Juan de Dios and assisted many people during an epidemic of measles.

He was known for his thoroughness, justice and integrity, and was well beloved by his subjects. He  fell in love with María Lugarda Ospina, known as la Marichuela. They had several children who bore the last name Celís. Nevertheless, both the cabildo and the archbishop of Bogotá asked the king to extend his mandate when it first expired after three years.

Juicio de residencia
 
He had some disputes with the Audiencia. His opponents charged him with various offenses in the juicio de residencia (trial of grievances) that followed his administration. This was a nearly routine investigation at the end of a viceregal administration. However, that of Solís was more than routine. Six months of testimony was taken, and the report forwarded to the Council of the Indies contained more than 20,000 sheets. The judge in the case was Miguel de Santisteban, whom the viceroy had considered his best friend, and who had held high positions in the viceregal government. The judgment of the court was that Solís was guilty of 22 of the charges, all relating to fraud or mismanagement of the viceregal treasury. This judgment was delivered on August 25, 1762, but Solís had by then entered the monastery.

The case was appealed to the Council of the Indies, which found Solís not guilty on all counts on August 29, 1764. The Council also praised him for the "love, fervor, effectiveness and dispatch" he had exhibited in his seven-year term of office.

Religious life
After turning over the office to his successor, Pedro Messía de la Cerda, he became a monk in a Franciscan convent (February 25, 1761). (He had been a member of the Third Order of Franciscans before he became viceroy.) He helped finance the construction of the church of the Third Order in Bogotá, and donated the bells and clock for the Church of San Francisco. He gave away the rest of his property to the poor and lived sequestered until his death in 1770, in Bogotá. Fray José de Jesús María (as he was known after taking the habit) became a priest in 1769. That year he was recommended to the king by the political and religious leaders of Bogotá as the next archbishop.

He never held that position. He died on April 27, 1770 in Bogotá, of a cold contracted at Easter. His skull is conserved in the sacristy of the Church of San Francisco in Bogotá.

References
 Mantilla, Luís Carlos. La autodefensa del Virrey-Fraile. Bogotá, Editorial Kelly, 1990.
 Mantilla, Luis Carlos. "La biblioteca del Virrey-Fraile". Thesaurus, Vol. 44, 1989.
 "Solís, José", in Gran Enciclopedia de Colombia

External links
 Encarta (Archived 2009-10-31)
 His article at La Biblioteca Luis Ángel Arango
 María Lugarda

1716 births
1770 deaths
Viceroys of New Granada
Spanish colonial governors and administrators
Spanish untitled nobility
Knights of Santiago